The Lansing Pharaohs are an American professional basketball team based out of Lansing, Michigan, and a member of The Basketball League (TBL).

History
It was announced that Lansing, Michigan would be awarded a franchise for the upcoming 2022 TBL season. The team is owned by entrepreneur Chris Jackson. Scott Newman was announced as the team's head coach. Previously he served as the assistant coach of Windsor Express.

On November 6, 2022 the team announced it would move to Oakland County, Michigan, sit out 2023 and be renamed as the Oakland County Pharaohs in 2024.

References

Sports in Oakland County, Michigan
The Basketball League teams
Basketball teams in Michigan